Rutherford is a neighbourhood in south Edmonton, Alberta, Canada. It is named after Alexander Cameron Rutherford, Alberta's first premier.

According to the 2005 municipal census, approximately 85% of the residences in the neighbourhood are single-family dwellings.  The remainder are mostly duplexes (13%) with a small number of row houses (2%).  The majority of residences (96%) are owner-occupied.

It is bounded on the west by 127 Street, on the east by James Mowatt Trail (111 Street), on the north by Ellerslie Road, and on the south by Blackmud Creek Ravine and a line connecting the ravine to 127 Street about 25 Avenue SW.

Demographics 

Education 
Rutherford is home to two schools for students in kindergarten through grade nine – Johnny Bright School of Edmonton Public Schools and Monsignor Fee Otterson Elementary/Junior High School of Edmonton Catholic Schools.

Surrounding neighbourhoods

References

External links 
 Rutherford Neighbourhood Profile

Neighbourhoods in Edmonton